Ceresole Reale is a comune (municipality) in the Metropolitan City of Turin in the Italian region of Piedmont, located about  northwest of Turin in the Orco Valley, on the border with France.

Ceresole Reale borders the following municipalities: Bonneval-sur-Arc (France), Groscavallo, Noasca, Rhêmes-Notre-Dame, Val-d'Isère (France), and Valsavarenche. The communal territory is home to the Gran Paradiso National Park visitors center. The main structure is the large dam, built in 1925–31 by A.E.M. (Turin's electrical authority): this formed the Lago di Ceresole (lake of Ceresole), which is now the town's main tourist attraction.
 
Ceresole was the location of the ending cliffhanger scene in the 1969 film The Italian Job.

The adjective Reale meaning 'royal' was conferred to the municipality because it hosted the royal hunting pavilions of the House of Savoy. It was therefore allowed to use the royal shield and the royal crown as the Commune's coat of arms. The only other commune that was allowed this privilege was Venaria Reale, as it hosted another hunting reserve and a royal palace of the Savoyard kings.

References

External links
Official website
 

Cities and towns in Piedmont
Canavese